Various spectrums of beliefs or practice within Mormonism accounts for categories of Mormons possessing faith or skepticism regarding various doctrines of The Church of Jesus Christ of Latter-day Saints (the mainstream LDS Church), or pertaining to issues of orthopraxy/heteropraxy, among those identifying as Mormon. People may also partake of Mormon culture to some degree as a result of having been raised in the LDS Church or else having converted and spent a large portion of one's life as an active member of the LDS Church. Such "cultural" Mormons may or may not be actively involved with the church. In some cases they may not even be, or have ever been, official members of the church.

Many cultural Mormons possess a strongly Mormon identity and abide with an appreciation for the lessons and the love they have received in the course of long church membership. Cultural Mormons do not necessarily hold anti-Mormon sentiments and often support the goals of the church. Many retain a sense of Mormon identity for life.

Both secular Mormons and progressive Mormons are sometimes referred to as on the left side of the religious spectrums; the more typical mainstream Mormons, in the center; and religious Mormons dissidents who disagree with certain changes to "original teachings" within Mormonism, on the right. Segments of the right include both fundamentalist Mormons and dissidents who participate in the Remnant movement.

Overview

The LDS Church tolerates a certain amount of disbelief in its doctrines and practices; but, in certain instances it might consider them grounds for disciplinary action.

LDS Church leaders teach that certain doubts can be resolved by "instruction, study, and prayer, which result in increased testimony, which drives out further doubts." However, disbelief in certain core doctrines (e.g.: the role of Jesus Christ as Savior and Redeemer; sustaining the leaders of the church as fulfilling their roles as prophets, seers, and revelators; etc.) can prevent a Mormon from participating in certain activities, such as priesthood ordinances and temple worship. Some Mormons keep certain doubts secret in order to participate in such activities, or to avoid conflict with family and friends. 

Disciplinary action on the grounds of apostasy may result when a member of the LDS Church 
publicly opposes church doctrines.

Internet communities

Fearing that divulging any heterodoxy may result in stigmatization by mainstream LDS, some Mormons prefer anonymity. Many participate in Internet communities, where they can discuss their issues anonymously.

New Order Mormons

One such group refers to itself as the New Order Mormons, a name patterned on the term New Order Amish (Amish who maintain cultural ties to their religion while not accepting some of its core tenets). This is a group of Mormons and former Mormons who no longer believe at least some of the tenets of the LDS Church, but because of family or cultural ties do not choose to completely separate themselves from the faith.

Humanistic Mormonism

Humanistic Mormonism is a movement of freethinkers, cultural Mormons, disfellowshipped or independents related to LDS Church and other Latter Day Saint groups that emphasize Mormon culture and history, but do not demand belief in a supernatural god, or the historicity of the Bible or the Book of Mormon. It is based on humanism and can be summarized in some points.

 A Mormon is someone who identifies with the history, culture and future of the LDS way of life.
 People possess the power and responsibility to shape their own lives independent of supernatural authority.
 Ethics and morality should serve human needs and choices should be based upon consideration of the consequences of actions rather than pre-ordained rules or commandments.
 The Bible, Book of Mormon or other religious texts are purely human and natural phenomena. Biblical and other traditional texts are the products of human activity and are best understood by scientific analysis.

The Society for Humanistic Mormonism characterizes itself as a "new worldwide religion of Humanistic Mormonism" with its own "General Authorities and Administrative Officers", and with its own unique doctrines, such as a "Covenant of Comedy and Humor".

See also

 Antinomianism
 Bloggernacle
 Blogs about Mormons and Mormonism
 Cafeteria Christianity
 Criticism of the Church of Jesus Christ of Latter-day Saints
 Cultural Catholic
 Cultural Christian
 Cultural Judaism
 Cultural Muslim
 Culture of The Church of Jesus Christ of Latter-day Saints
 Ex-Mormon
 Exmormon Foundation
 Groups within Mormonism
 Humanistic Judaism
 Irreligion
 Jack Mormon
 Lapsed Catholic
 List of former or dissident LDS
 Moralistic therapeutic deism
 Non-denominational
 Off the derech (Orthodox Jewish expression)
 Spiritual but not religious
 Stay LDS
 Sunday Christian

References

External links
New Order Mormons – A website for members of the LDS Church who no longer believe some (or many) of the doctrines of the LDS church, but who want to maintain membership for cultural and social reasons.
New Order Mormon Discussion Forum – "A forum for those who have chosen to remain connected with the LDS church for personal reasons and in spite of church history or present practices."
Society for Humanistic Mormonism – The official webpage for the Society for Humanistic Mormonism.
The Post-Mormon Community – An organization for those who have left the LDS Church and no longer believe in it.

Christian secularism
Latter Day Saint terms